The Torola River is a river in El Salvador and Honduras.

The river is 227 meters (745 feet) above sea level. Its length is 100.3 kilometers (62 miles).

References

Rivers of El Salvador
Rivers of Honduras
International rivers of North America
El Salvador–Honduras border
Border rivers